The Sun Moon Lake Wen Wu Temple is a Wen Wu temple located on the perimeter of Sun Moon Lake in Yuchi Township, Nantou County, Taiwan.

History
Previously, two temples were located on the coast of Sun Moon Lake. In 1919, the Japanese colonial government constructed a dam to generate hydroelectric power, causing the lake's water level to rise. The two temples were subsequently torn down and consolidated at the temple's present location in 1938.

After the Japanese handed over Taiwan to the Republic of China in 1945, the government invested in developing tourism around the lake. Wen Wu temple was rebuilt again in 1969, increasing its size and constructing it in the Chinese palace style.

Architecture

The temple consists of three halls. The first hall, located on the second floor of the front hall, is a shrine devoted to the First Ancestor Kaiji and the God of Literature. The central hall is devoted to Lord Guan, the Martial God, and the another Martial God, Lord Yue. The rear hall is dedicated to Confucius. Chinese guardian lions are located in front of the temple, one male and one female. Lions have not been found at Wen Wu Temples in Mainland China.

Transportation
The temple is accessible by bus from Taipei Railway Station, Taichung TRA station, or THSR Taichung Station.

See also
 Martial temple
 Wen Wu temple
 Xuanzang Temple
 List of temples in Taiwan
 Religion in Taiwan

References

Official website

  

1938 establishments in Taiwan
Religious buildings and structures completed in 1938
Taoist temples in Taiwan
Temples in Nantou County